Seefeld may refer to:

Places
 Seefeld in Tirol, a tourist resort in Tyrol, Austria
 Seefeld, Bavaria, a town in Starnberg, Bavaria, Germany
 Seefeld Castle
 Seefeld, Schleswig-Holstein, a municipality in Rendsburg-Eckernförde, Schleswig-Holstein, Germany
 Seefeld (Zürich), a district of Zürich, Switzerland

People
Martín Seefeld (born 1960), Argentine actor